The Numbers Start with the River is a 1971 American short documentary film about life in small river towns in America's heartland. Produced by Donald Wrye for the United States Information Agency, it was nominated for an Academy Award for Best Documentary Short.

References

External links

The Numbers Start with the River at the National Archives and Records Administration

1971 films
1971 short films
1971 documentary films
1971 independent films
1970s short documentary films
American independent films
American short documentary films
Documentary films about Iowa
Films shot in Iowa
Rural society in the United States
Films directed by Donald Wrye
United States Information Agency films
1970s English-language films
1970s American films